Rafael Chaves Câmara (born 5 May 2005) is a Brazilian racing driver who is a member of the Ferrari Driver Academy. He is scheduled to be competing in the 2023 Formula Regional European Championship, driving for Prema Racing.

Career

Karting 
Câmara began karting in 2014, where he competed in the Brazilian Karting Cup. He would soon move into international competitions, garnering particular success in 2019 by finishing second in the Karting World Championship, driving in the OK Junior class for Forza Racing. Having finished fifth in the European Championship during his first year of senior karting, Câmara would close his karting career in 2021 by winning a number of series, such as the WSK Champions Cup and WSK Super Master Series, as well as taking vice-champion status in the European Championship.

Lower formulae 
In 2022, Câmara made his single-seater debut, competing in the F4 UAE Championship with Prema Racing. Having missed the opening round due to contracting COVID-19, Câmara scored his first podium at round two in Dubai, before achieving his first pair of car racing victories at the same venue the following weekend. The penultimate event of the campaign brought even more success, as the Brazilian won three of the four races, putting himself in title contention before the season finale. Despite winning Race 1 at Yas Marina, a retirement in the third race owing to a collision clinched the title for teammate Charlie Wurz, with Câmara ending up second in the standings.

His main campaign would lie in Europe, where he would be driving in the Italian F4 and ADAC F4 series, partnering Wurz, Andrea Kimi Antonelli, Conrad Laursen and fellow FDA member James Wharton at Prema. The season in the German championship started out strongly, as two second places and a victory in Race 3 at Spa-Francorchamps gave Câmara the championship lead. Victory eluded him in the next two rounds, although the Brazilian was able to cement his place as the closest challenger to title favourite Antonelli, with a pair of podiums at Hockenheim and Zandvoort respectively. His championship challenge was thwarted before the next round at the Nürburgring however, as another contraction of COVID-19 forced Câmara to miss the event. He finished off his campaign with two pole positions and podiums at the second Nürburgring round, which earned Câmara the rookie title and third overall in the standings.

In Italy, Câmara experienced a competitive beginning to his campaign, inheriting victory at the season opener in Imola when race leader Antonelli experienced a gearbox failure in the closing laps. Another victory followed at Misano, where the Brazilian proved his opportunism by overtaking his Italian teammate at the safety car restart, which was then followed by another impressive weekend at Spa, where, having stalled from pole position in Race 3, Câmara recovered to third by the checkered flag. More podiums came at Vallelunga and the Red Bull Ring, before Câmara experienced his first and only podium-lacking event of the year at Monza. He finished his season third in the championship, falling behind Alex Dunne at the final round after a collision with the Irishman at the first corner.

Formula Regional 
Having tested with the team at the end of 2022, Câmara would progress to the Formula Regional European Championship with Prema Racing the following year, driving alongside Antonelli and category veteran Lorenzo Fluxá. Before his main campaign, Câmara will do the full season in the 2023 Formula Regional Middle East Championship with Mumbai Falcons.

Karting record

Karting career summary

Complete CIK-FIA Karting European Championship results 
(key) (Races in bold indicate pole position) (Races in italics indicate fastest lap)

Racing record

Racing career summary 

* Season still in progress.

Complete F4 UAE Championship results 
(key) (Races in bold indicate pole position) (Races in italics indicate fastest lap)

Complete ADAC Formula 4 Championship results 
(key) (Races in bold indicate pole position) (Races in italics indicate fastest lap)

Complete Italian F4 Championship results 
(key) (Races in bold indicate pole position) (Races in italics indicate fastest lap)

Complete Formula Regional European Championship results 
(key) (Races in bold indicate pole position) (Races in italics indicate fastest lap)

Complete Formula Regional Middle East Championship results
(key) (Races in bold indicate pole position) (Races in italics indicate fastest lap)

 – Driver did not finish the race but was classified, as he completed more than 90% of the race distance.
* Season still in progress.

References

External links 
 

2005 births
Living people
Brazilian racing drivers
Italian F4 Championship drivers
ADAC Formula 4 drivers
Prema Powerteam drivers
Formula Regional European Championship drivers
Karting World Championship drivers
UAE F4 Championship drivers
Mumbai Falcons drivers
Sportspeople from Recife
Formula Regional Middle East Championship drivers